The following is a list of notable deaths in September 1995.

Entries for each day are listed alphabetically by surname. A typical entry lists information in the following sequence:
 Name, age, country of citizenship at birth, subsequent country of citizenship (if applicable), reason for notability, cause of death (if known), and reference.

September 1995

1
Sylvia Gytha de Lancey Chapman, 98, New Zealand doctor and welfare worker.
María de la Cruz, 82, Chilean political activist, journalist, writer, and political commentator.
Joseph N. Gallo, 83, American mobster and member of the Gambino crime family.
Wilhelm Sold, 84, German football player.
Benay Venuta, 85, American actress, singer, and dancer, lung cancer.

2
Simona Arghir-Sandu, 46, Romanian handballer, cancer.
Bahri Guiga, 91, Tunisian lawyer and politician.
Václav Neumann, 74, Czech conductor, violinist, and opera director.
Earl T. Newbry, 95, American businessman and politician.

3
Lance Adams-Schneider, 75, New Zealand politician.
Mary Adshead, 91, British painter, muralist, illustrator and designer, heart failure.
Earle Birney, 91, Canadian poet and novelist.
Mort Browne, 87, Australian rules footballer.
D. C. Coleman, 75, British economic historian.
Parker Morton, 83, Australian rules football player and coach.

4
Paulo Gracindo, 84, Brazilian actor, prostate cancer.
Chuck Greenberg, 45, American musician (Shadowfax), heart attack.
Edmond Jouhaud, 90, French general involved in the Algiers putsch of 1961.
William Kunstler, 76, American lawyer and civil rights activist.
Fabio Pittorru, 66, Italian novelist, screenwriter, journalist and film director.

5
John Britten, 45, New Zealand mechanical engineer, cancer.
Tom Chisari, 72, American football coach.
Salil Chowdhury, 69, Indian songwriter,lyricist, writer, and poet.
Girija, 57, Indian actress.
Vinko Golob, 74, Bosnian-Herzegovinian football player.
Paul Julian, 81, American background animator, sound effects artist and voice actor.
Eny Karim, 84, Indonesian politician and civil servant.
Ahmed Koulamallah, 83, Chadian politician.
John Megna, 42, American actor, director and educator, AIDS-related complications.
Ante Nardelli, 58, Croatian water polo player.
Jean-Luc Pépin, 70, Canadian academic, and politician.
Francis Showering, 83, English brewer, heart attack.
Zulu Sofola, 60, Nigerian playwright and dramatist.
Benyamin Sueb, 56, Indonesian actor, comedian and singer.
Karl Warner, 87, American athlete and Olympic champion.

6
Sergio Atzeni, 42, Italian writer, drowned.
Michelangelo Borriello, 86, Italian sports shooter and Olympic athlete.
Gianni Caldana, 81, Italian track and field athlete who competed in the 1936 Summer Olympics.
Bill DeCorrevont, 76, American gridiron football player.
Mary Doran, 84, American actress.
Buster Mathis, 52, American boxer, heart failure.
Ralph Rosenblum, 69, American film editor (Annie Hall, The Producers, Fail-Safe).
B. K. Thapar, 73, Indian archaeologist.

7
John B. Calhoun, 78, American ethologist and behavioral researcher.
Richard Guy Condon, 43, American anthropologist, disappeared on this date and is presumed dead.
Al Papai, 78, American Major League Baseball player.
Michel Scob, 60, French cyclist.

8
Peter Baxandall, 74, English audio engineer and electronics engineer.
Madge Biggs, 93, Falkland Islands librarian and politician.
Paco Campos, 79, Spanish footballer .
Eileen Chang, 74, Chinese-born American essayist, novelist, and screenwriter.
Rose Chernin, 93, American communist and activist of Russian birth, Alzheimer's disease.
José Luis González Dávila, 52, Mexican football player.
Olga Ivinskaya, 83, Russian poet and writer, cancer.
Safa Khulusi, 78, Iraqi historian, novelist, poet, journalist and broadcaster.
Erich Kunz, 86, Austrian operatic bass baritone at the Vienna State Opera and Metropolitan Opera.
Halldis Moren Vesaas, 87, Norwegian poet, translator and writer of children's books.

9
Ida Carroll, 89, British music educator, double bassist, and composer.
Marina Núñez del Prado, 86, Bolivian sculptor.
Reinhard Furrer, 54, German physicist and astronaut, aircraft crash.
Lin Houston, 74, American gridiron football player.
Benjamin Mazar, 89, Israeli historian.
Erik Nilsson, 79, Swedish football player.
Béla Pálfi, 72, Serbian football player of Hungarian ethnicity.
Akimitsu Takagi, 74, Japanese crime fiction writer, stroke.
Keith Wayne, 50, American actor (Night of the Living Dead), suicide.
Jamie Whitten, 85, American politician and United States House of Representatives representative, heart failure.

10
Harriet Bell, 72, American advocate for disability rights.
Charles Denner, 69, French actor, cancer.
Molly Hide, 81, English cricketer.
Derek Meddings, 64, British special effects designer (Superman, Thunderbirds, Batman), Oscar winner (1979), colorectal cancer.
Shoji Suzuki, 63, Japanese jazz clarinet player and band leader.

11
Fred Campbell, 84, Australian politician and Queensland Legislative Assembly member.
Georges Canguilhem, 91, French philosopher and physician.
Anita Harding, 42, Irish-British neurologist, colorectal cancer.
Roger W. Heyns, 77, American professor and academic.
Charles J. Hitch, 85, American economist and Assistant Secretary of Defense.
Peter McIntyre, 85, New Zealand painter and author.
Kieth O'dor, 33, British racing driver, racing accident.
Vladislav Strzhelchik, 74, Soviet/Russian actor, brain cancer.

12
Lubomír Beneš, 59, Czech animator, director, and author.
Johnny Bothwell, 76, American jazz alto saxophonist and bandleader.
Jeremy Brett, 61, English actor (Sherlock Holmes, My Fair Lady, War and Peace), heart failure.
Grahame Clark, 88, British archaeologist.
Larry Gales, 59, American jazz double-bassist, leukemia.
Tom Helmore, 91, English actor (Vertigo, The Time Machine, This Could Be the Night).
Frederick Augustus Irving, 101, American Army officer.
Katherine Locke, 85, American actress.
Ernest Pohl, 62, Polish football player.  
Geoffrey Stokes, 55, American journalist and writer on music and sports, esophageal cancer.

13
Aluf Joseph Avidar, 89, Israeli statesman, author and ambassador.
Fritz Bennewitz, 69, German theatre director.
Eberhard Godt, 95, German naval officer.
Francesco Messina, 94, Italian sculptor.
Maheswar Neog, 80, Indian academic.
Harold Shepherdson, 76, English football player and coach.
Frank Silva, 44, American set dresser and actor (Twin Peaks), AIDS-related complications.

14
Leon Adams, 90, American journalist, publicist and historian.
Maurice K. Goddard, 83, American cabinet officer for six governors, suicide.
Emerson John Moore, 57, American prelate of the Roman Catholic Church.
Eiji Okada, 75, Japanese actor (Hiroshima mon amour, The Ugly American), heart failure.
A. E. Wilder-Smith, 79, British organic chemist and young Earth creationist.

15
Harry Calder, 94, English cricket player.
Douglass Cater, 72, American journalist, political aide, and college president.
Dirceu, 43, Brazilian football player, traffic collision.
Dietrich Hrabak, 80, German fighter pilot during World War II.
Sam McCluskie, 63, British trade unionist.
David McMullin, 87, American field hockey player and Olympian.
Pedro Nolasco, 33, Dominican boxer.
Gunnar Nordahl, 73, Swedish footballer.
Rien Poortvliet, 63, Dutch draughtsman and painter, bone cancer.
Nap Reyes, 75, American Major League Baseball player.
Michio Watanabe, 72, Japanese politician and Deputy Prime Minister of Japan, heart failure.

16
Michael Balfour, 86, English historian and civil servant.
Leo Horn, 79, Dutch football referee.
Aldo Novarese, 75, Italian type designer.
Pierre Olaf, 67, French actor.
Jack Wink, 73, American football player and coach.

17
Gottfried Bermann, 98, German publisher.
Catherine Cobb, 92, British jeweler and silversmith.
Yehuda Getz, 70–71, Israeli rabbi of the Western Wall for 27 years, heart attack.
Astrid Krebsbach, 82, German table tennis player.
Helen Nearing, 91, American author and vegetarianism advocate, single-car accident.
Friedrich Schütter, 74, German film and television actor.
Rakel Seweriin, 89, Norwegian politician.
Grady Sutton, 89, American actor.
Lucien Victor, 64, Belgian cyclist.

18
Doreen Cannon, 64, American teacher of acting at the Royal Academy of Dramatic Arts.
Donald Davie, 73, English Movement poet, and literary critic.
Jean Gol, 53, Belgian politician, cerebral hemorrhage.
Kaka Hathrasi, 89, Hindi satirist and humorist poet of India.
George S. Howard, 93, American conductor of The United States Air Force Band between 1947 and 1963.
Tony Paulekas, 83, American gridiron football player.
Oleh Tverdokhlib, 25, Ukrainian track and field athlete, domestic accident.

19
Mr. Bo, 63, American blues guitarist and singer, pneumonia.
Melbourne Brindle, 90, Australian-American illustrator and painter.
Walter Gross, 83, German-Israeli journalist who worked for Haaretz from 1949 through 1995.
Rauf Hajiyev, 73, Soviet and Azerbaijani composer and politician.
Rudolf Peierls, 88, German-born British physicist.
Orville Redenbacher, 88, American entrepreneur and businessman, heart attack.
Clinton Stephens, 75, American badminton player.

20
Charles Albanese, 58, American serial killer, execution by lethal injection.
Emmy Albus, 83, German sprinter.
Rene Anselmo, 69, American television executive.
Mikhail Bogdanov, 80, Russian production designer and Academy Award nominee.
Eulie Chowdhury, 71, Indian architect.
Walter A. Haas Jr., 79, President and CEO (1958–1976) and Chairman (1970–1981) of Levi Strauss & Co.
Monica Maurice, 87, British industrialist.
René Zazzo, 84, French psychologist and pedagogue.

21
Andy the Clown, 77, American clown associated with the Chicago White Sox.
Tony Cuccinello, 87, American baseball player and coach.
Delfy de Ortega, 75, Italian-Argentine actress, cancer.
Alan Christopher Deere, 77, New Zealand fighter ace during World War ||.
Frank Hall, 74, Irish broadcaster, journalist and film censor, heart attack.
Harry Hurwitz, 57, American film director, screenwriter, actor and producer, heart attack.
William Murray, 83, British educationist who created the Ladybird Peter and Jane books.
Rudy Perpich, 67, American politician and Governor of Minnesota, colorectal cancer.
Irven Spence, 86, American animator.

22
Julio Alejandro, 88, Spanish screenwriter.
Eigil Axgil, 80, Danish gay rights activist.
Dolly Collins, 62, English folk musician, arranger and composer.
Raimondo Del Balzo, 56, Italian screenwriter and director, cancer.
Albert Goodwin, 89, English historian.
Phillip Ingle, 34, American murderer, execution by lethal injection.
Bruno Junk, 65, Estonian race walker.
Nasiha Kapidžić-Hadžić, 63, Bosnian children's author and poet.
Antonio Pujol, 82, Mexican painter and printmaker.
John Whitney, 78, American animator, composer and inventor.

23
Thomas Beck, 85, American film and stage actor, Alzheimer's disease.
Carmen Bernos de Gasztold, 75, French poet.
Fabien Galateau, 82, French road bicycle racer.
Abdelkrim Laribi, 51, Algerian football player.
Booker T. Laury, 81, American boogie-woogie, blues, gospel and jazz pianist and singer, cancer.
K. Thurairatnam, 65, Sri Lankan lawyer and politician.
Joseph W. Tkach, 68, American evangelist and pastor of the Worldwide Church of God.
Albrecht Unsöld, 90, German astrophysicist.

24
Éric Borel, 16, French high school student and spree killer, suicide.
Peter Butler, 94, New Zealand seaman, trade unionist, and local politician.
Paula Dvorak, 82, Austrian film editor.
Keith Johnson, 66, Australian politician.
Tom McBride, 42, American photographer, model, and actor, AIDS-related complications.
Arthur Walsh, 72, Canadian actor and dancer.

25
Dave Bowen, 67, Welsh football player, manager, and captain.
Gustav Brom, 74, Czech big band leader, arranger, clarinetist and composer.
Annie Elizabeth Delany, 104, American dentist and civil rights pioneer.
Dorothy Dickson, 102, American actress and dancer on the London stage.
Maryse Justin, 36, Mauritian long-distance runner, cancer.
Dick Steinberg, 60, American football executive, stomach cancer.
Kei Tomiyama, 56, Japanese actor, voice actor, and narrator, pancreatic cancer.

26
Flora Blanc, 78, American theatre school director and painter.
Jack Broadstock, 74, Australian rules footballer.
Xenia Cage, 82, American painter, sculptor, bookbinder, conservator, and musician.
Lenny Hambro, 71, American jazz musician.
Lynette Roberts, 86, Welsh poet and novelist.
Kay Twomey, 81, American songwriter and music arranger.

27
Baha Akşit, 81, Turkish physician and politician.
Sasha Argov, 80, Israeli composer.
Jean Arnot, 92, Australian women's rights activist, trade unionist, and librarian.
Sean Conway, 64, Irish Fianna Fáil politician.
Laurence Jones, 62, British Royal Air Force commander.
Karl-Heinz Marbach, 78, German naval officer.
Christopher Shaw, 71, British composer.
Wilfried Soltau, 83, West German sprint canoer and Olympian.
Alison Steele, 58, American disk jockey known as 'Nightbird', stomach cancer.
Jürgen Wattenberg, 94, German naval officer and U-boat commander during World War II.

28
Rabah Belamri, 48, Algerian writer, complications following surgery.
Edgardo Coghlan, 66–67, Mexican painter.
Al Cromwell, 57, Canadian blues and folk musician.
Robert Curran, 72, Scottish nationalist political activist.
Billy Elliot, 31, Northern Irish loyalist and paramilitary leader, shot.
Olive Gibbs, 77, British politician and anti-nuclear weapons.
Albert Johanneson, 55, South African football player.
Aurelius Marie, 90, Dominican politician and jurist, cancer.
Edmundo O'Gorman, 88, Mexican writer, historian and philosopher.
Frederick N. Tebbe, 60, American chemist.

29
Alfred Felix Landon Beeston, 84, English Orientalist.
Gerd Bucerius, 89, German politician, publisher and journalist.
Michael Carr, 62, English cricketer.
James Downie, 73, New Zealand racing cyclist.
Seger Ellis, 91, American jazz pianist and vocalist.
Susan Fleetwood, 51, British actress, ovarian cancer.
Francis Johnson, 84, British architect.
Madalyn Murray O'Hair, 76, American activist, asphyxia.
Kostas Papachristos, 79, Greek actor.

30
Joe Azbell, 68, American journalist and writer, lung cancer.
Bertrand Boissonnault, 88, Canadian fencer who competed in the 1936 Summer Olympics.
George Kirby, 72, American comedian, Parkinson's disease.
Jean-Luc Lagarce, 38, French actor, theatre director and playwright, AIDS-related complications.
Jakob Segal, 84, Russian-German professor of biology .
Bertil von Wachenfeldt, 86, Swedish sprinter and Olympian.
Frederick Warner, 77, British diplomat.

References 

1995-09
 09